Arlette Conzemius (born 11 December 1956) is an ambassador from Luxembourg who is the permanent representative to NATO and Belgium.  She has also served as ambassador to the United States from 1998 until 2005.  She served concurrently as the non-resident ambassador to Canada, non-resident ambassador to Mexico, and permanent observer to the Organization of American States.

Education
Degree in Political Science from the Graduate Institute of International Studies, Geneva.
Master's Degree from the Fletcher School of Law and Diplomacy at Tufts University, Massachusetts.

References

 

Ambassadors of Luxembourg to Belgium
Ambassadors of Luxembourg to the United States
Ambassadors of Luxembourg to Canada
Ambassadors of Luxembourg to Mexico
Permanent Representatives of Luxembourg to NATO
Permanent Representatives of Luxembourg to the Organization of American States
Luxembourgian women ambassadors
The Fletcher School at Tufts University alumni
Graduate Institute of International and Development Studies alumni
1956 births
Living people